Jomala is a municipality of Åland, an autonomous territory of Finland. In terms of population, it is the next largest after Mariehamn, the capital of Åland.

The municipality is unilingually Swedish.

Mariehamn Airport is located in Jomala. Three of Åland's four highways cross the municipality of Jomala as they start from Mariehamn; highway 1 runs west to Eckerö, highway 2 northeast to Sund and highway 3 east to Lumparland.

History 
"Jomala" is the name of a god common to many Finnic peoples. Jumala is Finnish for god and Jomala is one of the sites where the Christian church organized itself in Finland. Other versions of the name that have occurred are Jwmala in 1356, Jomalum in 1414, Jomala in 1486 and Jwmala in 1494. One of oldest churches in Finland stands here as testament to these times.

Jomala was inhabited around 2000 BC  with Jettböle being one of the most renowned prehistoric sites. Other ancient sites include Borgberget, where there was a Viking fortress, and Kasberget which was one of the many mountains where signal fires were lit when enemies were seen approaching.

Before the city of Mariehamn was established in 1861, the peninsula where the city is situated was a part of Jomala.

Sights 
The church of Jomala is dedicated to the patron saint of Åland, St. Olav. It is the oldest surviving church in Finland and it is situated in the village of Prästgården. The oldest parts of the church date from the 13th century. The church tower is 52 meters tall and there is also a memorial for all the Ålanders who emigrated. Another memorial refers to sailors who lost their lives at sea. The "King of Åland" Julius Sundblom is buried here. A large medieval cemetery with graves from the Iron Age can be visited behind the church.

The Lemström channel divides Jomala from its neighboring municipality, Lemland. It was widened by Russian POWs in 1882.

The Kungsö battery was one of the ten coastal batteries which the Russians built in Åland during the First World War in 1916. The battery was situated 32 meters above sea level, on the highest point of Dalsberg. Finnish, Swedish and German troops invaded it in 1918. It was dismantled in 1919 by Finnish civilian workers.

There are various well-preserved windmills in Jomala, e.g. on Norrgård  farm in Björsby.

Culture 
Since Jomala belongs to the Swedish-speaking areas of Finland, Midsummer is celebrated every year by hoisting up a maypole. It was a tribute to the sun in the ancient times. Harvest festivities are held every September.

Geography 
Jomala is bordered by Lemland in the southwest, Mariehamn in the south, Hammarland in the northwest, Finström in the north and  Sund in the northeast.

Villages 
These are Andersböle, Björsby, Buskböle, Dalkarby, Djurvik, Gottby, Gölby, Hammarudda, Hinderböle, Ingby, Jomalaby, Karrböle, Kila, Kungsöby, Möckelby, Möckelö, Norrsunda, Rasmansböle, Ringsböle, Sviby, Södersunda, Torp, Ulvsby, Vargsunda, Västansunda, Västerkalmar, Ytterby, Ytternäs, Ödanböle, Önningeby, Österkalmar and Överby.

People from Jomala 
 Janne Holmén, long distance runner, European champion in men's marathon

Gallery

References

External links

Municipality of Jomala – Official website
Map of Jomala municipality

Municipalities of Åland